Therma (demonym), also called Asklepieis, was a town of ancient Greece on the island of Icaria.

Its site is located near modern Therma.

References

Populated places in the ancient Aegean islands
Former populated places in Greece
Icaria
Greek city-states